Herbert Franke may refer to:

Herbert Franke (sinologist) (1914–2011), German historian of China
Herbert W. Franke (born 1927), Austrian scientist and writer